Cleidion is a plant genus of the family Euphorbiaceae, first described in 1826. It is found in tropical and subtropical regions in Asia, Africa, Australia, Latin America, and various islands of the Pacific and Indian Oceans.

Species

formerly included
moved to other genera  (Acalypha, Acidoton, Adenophaedra, Alchornea, Bocquillonia, Cleidiocarpon, Conceveiba, Macaranga, Orfilea, Plukenetia, Trigonostemon)

References

Acalypheae
Euphorbiaceae genera